Grigoris Valtinos (Greek: Γρηγόρης Βαλτινός; born August 7, 1955) is a Greek television and stage actor.

He is perhaps best known for playing Hector Anagnostou on Erotas, a role he has played since 2005.

Selected filmography
Ta Paidia tis Niovis (2004) (TV Series) as Mihalakis Anastasiadis (Sarris)
Megalos thimos, O (1998) (TV Series) as Asimakis
Dipli alithia (1996) (TV Series)
Prova nifikou (1995) (TV Series) as Petros Manias
Anatomia enos eglimatos (1992) (TV Series) as Narrator
Fakelos Amazon (1991) (TV Series)
Treis harites, Oi (1990) as Yannis Alexiou
Thanatos tou Timotheou Konsta, O (1986) (TV Series)
Dikigoroi, Oi (1982) (TV Series)
Astrofeggia (1980) (TV Series)
Eleftherios Venizelos: 1910-1927 (1980)

External links
 

1955 births
Greek male soap opera actors
Greek male stage actors
Greek male television actors
Greek theatre directors
Living people
Actors from Thessaloniki